Naramsimha is a Bollywood film. It was released in 1991 and stars Dimple Kapadia.

References

External links
 

1991 films
1990s Hindi-language films